Vakhtang Jajanidze (July 16, 1987) is a Georgian film director and screenwriter. He studied in Shota Rustaveli Theatre and Film University.

Biography
Jajanidze was born in 1987 in Chiatura, Georgia. He graduated from the Faculty of International Business and Law at Ivane Javakhishvili State University in 2010. He continued studying in Shota Rustaveli Theatre and Film University. He made his first student short film in 2010, when he was at the first grade of studying, at age 23.

Jajanidze made several short documentaries between 2010 and 2015 years. His most successful film was Exodus (გამოსვლა), which was screened at many short or major film festivals, including the  Tbilisi International Film Festival and Filmfest Dresden. Exodus is the story of two middle-aged sisters, Tatiana and Lili, who live in a small Georgian town.

Filmography

Short films
 Exodus (2015)
 Tbilisi from Dawn till Dusk (2013)
 Once in a Park (2012)
 From Monday till Monday (2012)
 Short Film on the Declaration of Human Rights (2011)
 Students' Expedition in Tao-Klarjeti (2011)
 I (2010)

References

External links

1987 births
Living people
Film directors from Georgia (country)
Screenwriters from Georgia (country)
Film people from Tbilisi